Princess Elisabeth Marie Alice Viktoria of Hesse and by Rhine (11 March 1895 – 16 November 1903) was a German Hessian and Rhenish child princess, the only daughter of Ernst Ludwig, Grand Duke of Hesse and by Rhine, and his first wife, Princess Victoria Melita of Saxe-Coburg and Gotha. She was named after her paternal great-grandmother, who was born Princess Elisabeth of Prussia. Her paternal aunt had the same name and was also nicknamed Ella. Elisabeth's early death was rumored to be a result of poison meant for her uncle, Tsar Nicholas II, but the court physician said she died of virulent typhoid fever, probably caused by her taking a drink of water from a contaminated stream.

Birth
 Her parents, nicknamed 'Ernie' and 'Ducky,' were first cousins who married at the instigation of their common grandmother, Queen Victoria. The marriage was an unhappy one from the start. Princess Victoria Melita was eighteen at the time of Elisabeth's birth. She was fond of Elisabeth, but found it hard to compete with Ernst's devotion to their daughter. Ernst was convinced even before Elisabeth could speak that he alone could understand her. At the age of six months, she was scheduled to move to a new nursery and her father 'consulted' her on her color preferences. He claimed that she made 'happy little squeals' when he showed her a particular shade of lilac material. Ernst then decorated her nursery in shades of lilac. He later had a playhouse built for his daughter that stood in its own garden. Adults were forbidden to enter "much to the frustration of royal nurses and tutors, who could be seen pacing up and down impatiently outside as they waited for their high-spirited young charges to stop their games and emerge."

Childhood
 
Margaretta Eagar, a governess for the daughters of Tsar Nicholas II, described Elisabeth as "a sweet and pretty child, with wide grey-blue eyes and a profusion of dark hair. She was much like her mother, not only in face, but also in manner." The four-year-old Elisabeth wanted a baby sister and tried to persuade her aunt and uncle to let her parents adopt one of her paternal first cousins, Tatiana or Maria. Her parents had only one other child together, a stillborn son, in 1900.
She was a favorite with her great-grandmother Queen Victoria, who called the little girl "my precious". Queen Victoria refused to permit the unhappily married Victoria and Ernst to divorce for the sake of Elisabeth. It was Elisabeth whom Queen Victoria asked to see first and to receive eightieth birthday greetings from in 1899. When the child heard Queen Victoria's pony cart approaching on the road below Windsor Castle, the four-year-old Elisabeth ran out on the balcony, waving and calling, "Granny Gran, I'm here!" Elisabeth's playfulness made the queen laugh out loud. Elisabeth's grandmother, the Dowager Duchess of Saxe-Coburg and Gotha, brought five-year-old Elisabeth to see Queen Victoria on her death bed on 22 January 1901. After the queen died, the child was taken in to see her body and told that her great-grandmother had gone to be with the angels. "But I don't see the wings," Elisabeth whispered. Elisabeth sat next to her second cousin Prince Edward of York (called David by family and friends, later to become King Edward VIII in 1936) during Queen Victoria's funeral. "Sweet little David behaved so well during the service," wrote his aunt Maud, "and was supported by the little Hesse girl who took him under her protection and held him most of the time round his neck. They looked such a delightful little couple."

In his memoirs, written more than thirty years after her death, her father wrote of Elisabeth's "deep sensitivity" and "very large heart." He wrote that "I never knew a child who had so much influence on adults. Her inner personality was very strong, and she had a natural quality that protected her from being spoiled." In October 1901, after the death of Queen Victoria, Elisabeth's parents finally divorced. Her mother had rekindled a previous romance with another cousin, her future husband, Grand Duke Cyril Vladimirovich of Russia. Her father, according to letters written by her mother, had been caught cavorting with domestic servants. Her parents' divorce meant that Elisabeth divided her year between Darmstadt and her mother's new home in Coburg. Elisabeth was at first mistrustful of her mother and resented the divorce, although Victoria did her best to mend her relationship with her daughter during her visit with Elisabeth in the spring of 1902. She was only partially successful, though Victoria enjoyed turning her daughter into an outstanding horsewoman.

In his memoirs, Ernst said he had difficulty persuading Elisabeth to visit her mother. Before one visit, he found the child "whimpering under a sofa, full of despair." He assured Elisabeth that her mother loved her too. "Mama says she loves me, but you do love me," Elisabeth replied. Margaret Eagar thought the child's eyes were the saddest she had ever seen. "Looking at her I used to wonder what those wide grey-blue eyes saw, to bring such a look of sadness to the childish face," she wrote. Eagar wondered if Elisabeth had a premonition of her own death because she often told her cousin Grand Duchess Olga Nikolaevna of Russia that "I shall never see this again." However, despite Elisabeth's sad eyes, she was generally a sweet, happy child who was a peacemaker when her cousins had a dispute.

Death

On 6 October 1903, Ernst hosted a large family gathering at Darmstadt for the wedding of his niece, Princess Alice of Battenberg, to Prince Andrew of Greece and Denmark. A few weeks later he took Elisabeth to stay with his younger sister, Empress Alexandra Feodorovna, her husband, Tsar Nicholas II, and their family. At the imperial family's hunting lodge in Skierniewice, Poland, Elisabeth went on long walks and had picnics in the forest with her cousins.

Her nanny, who called Elisabeth "my baby," woke Elisabeth in the middle of the night and settled her in a window seat of the nursery so that she might look out on the game spread out upon the grounds below. One morning, the eight-year-old awoke with a sore throat and pains in her chest, which the Russian Court doctor put down to too much excitement with her cousins the previous day. Her fever rose to 104 degrees. The imperial party didn't believe her illness was a serious one and went ahead with their plans for the day and attended the theater as planned. By the evening Elisabeth was in even more severe pain and had started gasping for breath. A specialist was summoned from Warsaw. The specialist gave her injections of caffeine and camphor to stimulate her slowing heart, but without success.

"Suddenly she sat up in her bed and looked from one to the other of us with wide, frightened eyes," wrote Eagar. "She cried out suddenly, 'I'm dying! I'm dying!' She was coaxed to lie down again, but remained agitated. "The child turned to me, and said anxiously, 'Send a telegram to mama.'" Eagar promised it would be done. "She added, 'immediately.' ... We continued to fan the feeble spark of life, but moment by moment it declined. She began to talk to her cousins, and seemed to imagine she was playing with them. She asked for little Anastasie and I brought the wee thing into the room. The dying eyes rested on her for a moment, and Anastasie said, 'Poor cousin Ella! Poor Princess Elizabeth!' I took the baby out of the room." Doctors told Alexandra that the child's mother should be notified, but the telegram did not arrive until the following morning, when Elisabeth had already died. An autopsy following her death confirmed that she had died of virulent typhoid, although it was rumored she had eaten from a poisoned dish intended for the Tsar.

Funeral and legacy
    Elisabeth's body was placed in a silver casket, a gift from Nicholas II, for the journey back to Darmstadt. Her father arranged a white funeral, with white instead of black for the funeral trappings, white flowers, and white horses for the procession. The Hessian people came out by the thousands to view the funeral procession and "sobbed in unison so that I could hear it," Ernst wrote. A cousin, Kaiser Wilhelm II, expressed shock at the child's death in a letter to Tsar Nicholas II on the day after. "How joyous and merry she was that day at Wolfsgarten, when I was there, so full of life and fun and health ... What a terrible heartrending blow for poor Ernie, who doted and adored that little enchantress!"  Elisabeth was buried in the Rosenhöhe with other members of the Hessian grand ducal family. A marble angel was later installed to watch over her grave. In a final gesture to Elisabeth and Ernst, Victoria Melita placed her badge of the Order of Hesse, granted to her upon her marriage, into Elisabeth's coffin. Ernst was still devastated by the memory of his daughter's death thirty years later. "My little Elisabeth," he wrote in his memoirs, "was the sunshine of my life."

Archives
Documents about Elisabeth's death, including telegrams and letters from relatives and a Hessian employee to Elisabeth's aunt, Princess Alexandra of Saxe-Coburg and Gotha, are preserved in the Hohenlohe Central Archive (Hohenlohe-Zentralarchiv Neuenstein), which is in Neuenstein Castle in the town of Neuenstein, Baden-Württemberg, Germany.

Ancestry

Notes

References
Margaret Eagar, Six Years at the Russian Court, 1906.
Andrei Maylunas and Sergei Mironenko, editors; Darya Galy, translator, A Lifelong Passion: Nicholas and Alexandra: Their Own Story, Weindenfeld and Nicolson, 1997, 
Michael John Sullivan, A Fatal Passion: The Story of the Uncrowned Last Empress of Russia, Random House, 1997, 
John Van Der Kiste, Princess Victoria Melita, Sutton Publishing Ltd., 2003, ASIN B000K2IRNU

External links

The Royal Half, by Phyllis Tuchman, an article in Artnet Magazine.

1895 births
1903 deaths
House of Hesse-Darmstadt
German princesses
Deaths from typhoid fever
Infectious disease deaths in Poland
Nobility from Darmstadt
Burials at the Mausoleum for the Grand Ducal House of Hesse, Rosenhöhe (Darmstadt)
Royalty and nobility who died as children
Daughters of monarchs